Efstratios "Stratos" Voulgaropoulos (born October 31, 2000) is a Greek professional basketball player for Iraklis of the Greek Elite League, on a two-way contract agreement from Lavrio. He is 2.18 m (7'2") tall, and he plays at the center position.

Professional career
Voulgaropoulos joined the youth teams of the Greek club KAOD, in 2014. He signed with the youth teams of the Greek club Aris, in 2016. In the 2018–19 season, he played in Greece's top-tier Greek Basket League, for the first time, with the senior men's team of Aris, in a game against Panathinaikos. 

In the summer of 2020, Voulgaropoulos moved south for Lavrio, where he miraculously reached the Greek Basket League finals in 2021. In 18 games, he averaged 1.9 points, 1.3 rebounds and 0.3 blocks, playing around 6 minutes per contest. In 18 league games during the 2021-22 campaign, Voulgaropoulos posted an identical stat line of 1.9 points, 1.3 rebounds and 0.3 blocks in 6 minutes per contest.

On November 7, 2022, Voulgaropoulos returned to Thessaloniki for Iraklis via a two-way contract loan deal.

National team career
Voulgaropoulos has been a member of the junior national teams of Greece. With Greece's junior national teams, he played at the 2018 FIBA Under-18 European Championship, and at the 2019 FIBA Under-19 World Cup.

References

External links
FIBA Europe Cup Profile 
Basketball-Reference.com Profile
Eurobasket.com Profile
KapaSports.gr Profile
Greek Basket League Profile 
Greek Basket League Profile 
Aris Profile

2000 births
Living people
Aris B.C. players
Centers (basketball)
Greek Basket League players
Greek men's basketball players
Iraklis Thessaloniki B.C. players
K.A.O.D. B.C. players
Lavrio B.C. players
Basketball players from Thessaloniki